Kuzma Grigorevich Trufanov was a Soviet Red Army major general during the Second World War.

Trufanov joined the Red Army in 1918, fighting in the Russian Civil War and the Polish–Soviet War. He became a cavalry officer and participated in the Battle of Lake Khasan in 1938. Before the German invasion of the Soviet Union Trufanov became commander of the 7th Mechanized Corps' motorcycle regiment. He was severely wounded in the corps' unsuccessful Lepel counterattack in July 1941 and received the Order of Lenin for his actions. After recovering, Trufanov became commander of a cavalry school. In March 1943 he became deputy commander of the 5th Guards Tank Army. During the Battle of Prokhorovka, part of the Battle of Kursk, Trufanov led the army's reserve in the counterattack at Prokhorovka. In September he was given command of the army's 18th Tank Corps. However, Trufanov did not command for long, as he was severely wounded during the Battle of the Dnieper in October. After a year of treatment in the hospital, Trufanov was discharged from the army in November 1944.

References

Citations

Bibliography 

1901 births
1958 deaths
People from Voronezh Oblast
People from Nizhnedevitsky Uyezd
Communist Party of the Soviet Union members
Soviet major generals
Russian military personnel of World War I
Soviet military personnel of the Russian Civil War
People of the Polish–Soviet War
Soviet military personnel of World War II
Russian people of World War II
Recipients of the Order of Lenin
Recipients of the Order of the Red Banner
Recipients of the Order of Suvorov, 2nd class